Sayyid Shahab od-Din Sadr is an Iranian physician and principlist politician.

Career
Sadr was one of ten candidates in the presidential elections in 2001. He was also a Member of Parliament of Iran from Tehran in three terms. He was disqualified in 2012 Iranian legislative election.

References

External links

1962 births
Living people
Second Deputies of Islamic Consultative Assembly
Islamic Association of Physicians of Iran politicians
Islamic Coalition Party politicians
Candidates in the 2001 Iranian presidential election
Secretaries-General of political parties in Iran